Placostylus ambagiosus is a species of flax snail (Māori: pūpū whakarongotaua), a large air-breathing land snail, a terrestrial pulmonate gastropod mollusc in the family Bothriembryontidae.

Description
This snail has a large ( long) shell, which is heavily calcified. The size of the adult shell is habitat dependent, but the shell shape is not plastic.  Placostylus ambagiosus is highly valued by Te Aupōuri me Ngāti Kurī (the indigenous people of northern New Zealand) as a food source, musical instrument and in the past this snail provided alarm calls at night warning of approaching invaders.

Distribution 
This land snail species occurs in New Zealand. It is restricted to a small fragmented area of Northland Region, including the Aupouri Peninsula and Motuopao Island. In the past local Māori moved and propagated populations of Placostylus ambagiosus, so today at least three extant populations are found on old pā sites (fortified settlements), along with other species that were cultivated such as karaka (Corynocarpus laevigatus) and harakeke (Phormium tenax).

Biology 
This snail feeds at night on fallen leaves on the forest floor. A favorite plant species is hangehange (Geniostoma ligustrifolium). Placostylus ambagiosus needs year round moisture provided by deep leaf-litter. Eggs are laid in clutches (average 43 eggs) in the shallow hollows in the soil.  The species is slow-growing with a lifespan of 10–22 years and strong site fidelity The same individual snail has been found under the same food plant for 12 years. The species is endangered due to predation from rats and birds, habitat damage by pigs and horses and competition from introduced snails.

Hypothetical subspecies 
Based on molecular phylogeny (mtDNA)  and shell morphology research it was suggested in 2011 by Buckley et al. that there are no subspecies of Placostylus ambagiosus.
However, in the past, what were thought to be eight extant subspecies and a number of undescribed but distinct populations, were named; six of these "subspecies" are now extinct (marked with a †); conservation statuses were given according to the New Zealand Threat Classification System for the extant taxa: "nationally critical" and "nationally endangered":  At least five subspecies of Placostylus ambagiosus can be recognized using shell shape (not size or location) of individuals snails suggesting these represented distinct populations that require protection. 
Placostylus ambagiosus "Herangi Hill" †
Placostylus ambagiosus "nouvelle" - nationally endangered
Placostylus ambagiosus "Haupatoto" - nationally critical
Placostylus ambagiosus "Kauaetewhakapeke Stream" - nationally critical
Placostylus ambagiosus "Kohuronaki" - nationally critical
Placostylus ambagiosus "Poroiki" - nationally critical
Placostylus ambagiosus "Te Paki" - nationally endangered
Placostylus ambagiosus "Tirikawa" - nationally critical
Placostylus ambagiosus ambagiosus Suter, 1906 - nationally critical
Placostylus ambagiosus annectens Powell, 1938 2
Placostylus ambagiosus consobrinus Powell, 1938 - nationally critical
Placostylus ambagiosus gardneri †
Placostylus ambagiosus hancoxi 1
Placostylus ambagiosus hinemoa †
Placostylus ambagiosus keenorum Powell, 1938 - nationally endangered
Placostylus ambagiosus lesleyae †
Placostylus ambagiosus michiei Powell, 1951 - nationally endangered
Placostylus ambagiosus pandora Powell, 1951 - nationally critical
Placostylus ambagiosus paraspiritus Powell, 1951 - nationally endangered
Placostylus ambagiosus priscus †
Placostylus ambagiosus spiritus †
Placostylus ambagiosus watti Powell, 1947 - nationally critical
Placostylus ambagiosus whareana Powell, 1951 - nationally critical
Placostylus ambagiosus worthyi †

References

Further reading 
 Powell A. W. B. (1979). New Zealand Mollusca, William Collins Publishers Ltd., Auckland, New Zealand, .
 Suter H. (1913). Manual of the New Zealand Mollusca. Wellington, 1120 pp., page 768.

ambagiosus
Gastropods described in 1906
Gastropods of New Zealand